Brian Heslop (born 4 August 1947) is an English former professional footballer who played as a full-back for Sunderland.

References

1947 births
Living people
Footballers from Carlisle, Cumbria
English footballers
Association football fullbacks
Carlisle United F.C. players
Sunderland A.F.C. players
Northampton Town F.C. players
Workington A.F.C. players
Northwich Victoria F.C. players
English Football League players